Raffaello Martinelli (born 21 June 1948) is an Italian prelate of the Catholic Church.

He was born in Villa d'Almè, and was ordained a priest for the Diocese of Bergamo on 8 April 1972. He served as bureau chief at the Congregation for the Doctrine of the Faith.

On 2 July 2009 he was appointed Bishop of Frascati by Pope Benedict XVI. He received his episcopal consecration on the following 12 September from Benedict XVI, with Cardinals Tarcisio Bertone and William Levada serving as co-consecrators, at St. Peter's Basilica.

References

External links

1948 births
Living people
Clergy from the Province of Bergamo
Bishops in Lazio